Extension of the Wish is the debut album by Andromeda.

The album has been reviewed with 2/5 by Allmusic, and 8.5/10 by Rockhard.de (review of the "definitive edition").

Track listing
(All music and lyrics by Johan Reinholdz)
"The Words Unspoken" – 5:28
"Crescendo of Thoughts" – 5:24
"In the Deepest of Waters" – 7:07
"Chameleon Carneval" – 4:59
"Starshooter Supreme" – 5:18
"Extension of the Wish" – 10:03
"Arch Angel" – 5:54
"Journey of Polyspheric Experience" - 5:42

Credits

Band
Johan Reinholdz - Guitar
Martin Hedin - Keyboards
Thomas Lejon - Drums
Gert Daun - Bass
Lawrence Mackrory - Session Vocalist

Other
Daniel Bergstrand - Engineer
Johan Reinholdz - Engineer
Staffan "Hitman" Olofsson - Mastering
Niklas Sundin - Graphics/Art direction
Dennis Tencic - Layout
Wez Wenedikter - Executive producer

References

External links
Allmusic link

2001 debut albums
Andromeda (Swedish band) albums
Century Media Records albums